HMS Princess Royal was a 91-gun second rate ship of the line of the Royal Navy, launched on 23 June 1853 at Portsmouth.

She took part in both the Baltic Campaign and the naval bombardment of Sebastopol during the Crimean War. She later served as the flagship of Rear-Admiral George St Vincent King in his role as Commander-in-Chief, East Indies and China Station.

In 1865, Princess Royal conveyed Sir Harry Smith Parkes, accompanied by a detachment of Royal Marines, to the treaty port of Yokohama on his appointment as envoy to Japan. Admiral of the Fleet Lord Walter Kerr served as a lieutenant on board Princess Royal during the ship's deployment to Japan.

She was broken up in 1872. For more than 30 years, the wooden figurehead of Princess Royal adorned the outer wall of Castle's ship breaking yard at Baltic Wharf, Millbank, London.

Citations and notes

External links 
 

Ships of the line of the Royal Navy
1853 ships
Frigates of the Royal Navy
Victorian-era frigates of the United Kingdom
Crimean War naval ships of the United Kingdom
Ships built in Portsmouth